The Rising is a 2022 British supernatural crime drama television series produced by Sky Studios. It is based on the 2017 Belgian series (Hotel) Beau Séjour, created by Bert Van Dael and Sanne Nuyens.

Synopsis
The Rising tells the story of Neve Kelly, a young girl who finds out that she is dead. Once she realizes that she has been murdered, she determines to find her killer and get justice. As she begins her investigation, Neve discovers that she has the ability to interfere in the world around her as well as interact with certain individuals, one of whom she grows close to.

Cast and characters
 Clara Rugaard as Neve Kelly
 Nicholas Gleaves as William Wyatt
 William Ash as Michael Wyatt
 Matthew McNulty as Tom Rees
 Rebecca Root as DS Diana Aird
 Emily Taaffe as Maria Kelly
 Alex Lanipekun as Daniel Sands
 Ann Ogbomo as Christine Wyatt
 Nenda Neururer as Alex Wyatt
 Robyn Cara as Katie Sands
 Solly McLeod as Joseph Wyatt
 Cameron Howitt as Max Sands
 Lee Byford as desk sergeant

Release
The first trailer debuted on 6 December 2021, and the series premiered on 22 April 2022.

Production
The Rising is the first full in-house production for Sky Studios. Principal photography began in May 2021 in the north of England, with filming locations that included the Lake District and the areas surrounding Manchester. The eight episodes were split into four filming blocks, with each two episodes helmed by different directors. Filming wrapped up in October 2021, and post-production continued into early 2022, with final picture and sound work being completed in London.

Episodes

Publicity
In Cumbria, a hologram of the protagonist, Neve, was projected onto Derwentwater the day before the series was released. The figure mouthed "come and find me" to passers-by, who were surprised to stumble upon the projection on their morning walk.

Reception
Writing for Fiction Horizon, Nelson Acosta gave the show a mostly positive review, praising Clara Rugaard's acting, as well as the cinematography. He also commented that it lacked humour and dynamism. At The Upcoming, Andrew Murray also complimented newcomer Rugaard and wrote positively about the show's plotlines and hooks. He critiqued its focus on teen drama, however.

References

External links
 

2022 British television series debuts
2020s British crime drama television series
British supernatural television shows
British television series based on non-British television series
Sky UK original programming
English-language television shows
Television shows set in England
Television shows filmed in England